Dash One is an album by Eric Dolphy consisting of alternate takes of four pieces recorded for other albums. 

"G.W." and "245" were recorded on April 1, 1960, during the Outward Bound session. "Serene" was recorded on December 21, 1960, during the Far Cry session. "Bee Vamp," recorded on July 16, 1961, is a studio take of a tune which also appears on the live album At the Five Spot. The album was released in 1982 by Prestige Records.

Reception

In a review for AllMusic, Scott Yanow wrote: "This LP contains four rare items by Eric Dolphy, alternate takes of 'G.W.,' '245,' 'Bee Vamp' and 'Serene.' The first two selections also feature trumpeter Freddie Hubbard while Booker Little provides the brass on the latter two songs. Needless to say, Dolphy (heard here on alto and bass clarinet) takes completely different improvisations than on the originally released recordings, making this a valuable addition to his discography."

A reviewer for Jazz Times stated: "Dash One is as much an invaluable document for the Dolphy scholar and student as it is an excellent buy for the price-conscious general listener."

Track listing

 "G.W." (Dolphy) – 12:07
 "245" (Dolphy) – 7:54
 "Bee Vamp" (Booker Little) – 9:33
 "Serene" (Dolphy) – 6:38

Personnel 
 Eric Dolphy – alto saxophone, bass clarinet, flute
 Freddie Hubbard – trumpet (tracks 1 and 2)
 Booker Little – trumpet (tracks 3 and 4), 
 Jaki Byard – piano (tracks 1, 2, and 4)
 Mal Waldron – piano (track 3)
 George Tucker – bass (tracks 1 and 2)
 Richard Davis – bass (track 3)
 Ron Carter – bass (track 4)
 Roy Haynes – drums (tracks 1, 2, and 4)
 Ed Blackwell – drums (track 3)

References

1982 albums
Eric Dolphy albums
Prestige Records albums